Island of the Lizard King is a single-player adventure gamebook written by Ian Livingstone, and illustrated by Alan Langford. Originally published by Puffin Books in 1984, the title is the seventh gamebook in the Fighting Fantasy series. It was later republished by Wizard Books in 2002. A digital version developed by Tin Man Games was released for Android and iOS.

Rules

Story

The player takes the role of an adventurer tasked with stopping the Lizard King and freeing the human slaves captured by his army. Gameplay takes the form of a campaign: battling Lizard Men and various other monsters across the island whilst collecting information as to the Lizard King's weakness, which will be required during the final confrontation.

Reception
Marcus L. Rowland reviewed Island of the Lizard King for the May 1984 issue of White Dwarf, rating the title 8 out of a possible 10. Rowland claimed that Island of the Lizard King "seemed to contain more monsters and less traps than others in the series, and most of the traps seemed to be fair", concluding that this was "probably the toughest adventure of this series, since few options allow the adventurer to avoid a fight".

In other media
A digital version developed by Tin Man Games is available for Android and iOS.

References

External links
 Fighting Fantasy Gamebooks - the official website
 Wizard Books - the Publisher's site

1984 fiction books
Books by Ian Livingstone
Fighting Fantasy gamebooks